Gadde Ramamohan Rao was a member of the 13th Lok Sabha of India from Vijayawada constituency of Andhra Pradesh as a member of the Telugu Desam Party. He was also a Member of the Legislative Assembly of Andhra Pradesh, representing Gannavaram constituency during 1994–1999. He was the Vijayawada Urban division convenor for TDP from 2004 to 2009. He serves as the head of TDP in Vijayawada East constituency. He won from Vijayawada (East) assembly constituency for 2014 Andhra Pradesh elections. He was again re-elected from same constituency in 2019 Andhra Pradesh elections.

His wife, Gadde Anuradha, is also a politician from TDP party and had served as Krishna ZP Chairperson.

References

External links

Year of birth missing (living people)
Living people
India MPs 1999–2004
Andhra Pradesh MLAs 1994–1999
Andhra Pradesh MLAs 2014–2019
Telugu Desam Party politicians
Lok Sabha members from Andhra Pradesh
Politicians from Vijayawada
Telugu politicians
Andhra Pradesh MLAs 2019–2024